The 1997–98 League of Wales was the sixth season of the League of Wales since its establishment in 1992. The league was won for the third consecutive year by Barry Town, who accrued a total of 104 points – one less than the previous season – scoring 134 goals in the process (an average of 3.53 goals per game).

League table

Results

References

Cymru Premier seasons
1997–98 in Welsh football leagues
Wales